Grole is a former settlement in Newfoundland and Labrador. It is located 15km from the town of Hermitage and approximately 50km from Saint Pierre and Miquelon.

Ghost towns in Newfoundland and Labrador